1971 Coppa delle Alpi shows the results of the 1971 tournament that was held in Switzerland in the preseason 1971/72. The Coppa delle Alpi (translated as Cup of the Alps) was a football tournament, jointly organized by the Italian Football Federation and the Swiss Football Association as a pre-season event.

Overview
There were four participants from Italy, these being Hellas Verona, Lazio, Sampdoria and Varese and there were four from Switzerland: Lugano, Lausanne Sports, Winterthur and FC Basel. Two teams from each country were drawn into each of the two groups. Within the group each team played the two clubs of the other country twice, but did not play compatriots. The Italians and the Swiss each formed their own league table and the winners from each country then matched themselves in the final.

Matches

Group A
Round 1

Round 2

Round 3

Round 4

Group B
Round 1

Round 2

Round 3

Round 4

League Tables

Switzerland

Italy

NB: Decisive points total (DPT) computed as sum of points and goals scored

Final
The Final was played in St. Jakob Stadium, Basel, between the winner of the Italien and the winner of the Swiss groups.

Sources and References 
 Cup of the Alps 1971 at RSSSF

Cup of the Alps
Alps